The influence of French on English pertains mainly to its lexicon but also to its syntax, grammar, orthography, and pronunciation. Most of the French vocabulary in English entered the language after the Norman Conquest of England in 1066, when Old French, specifically the Old Norman dialect, became the language of the new Anglo-Norman court, the government, and the elites. That period lasted for several centuries until the aftermath of the Hundred Years' War (1337–1453). However, English has continued to be influenced by French. According to Laura K. Lawless, more than a third of current English vocabulary is of French origin. And according to the linguist Henriette Walter, words of French origin represent more than two-thirds of the English vocabulary.

Background

Before 1066
In the early 11th century, Old English was not a single unified language but a dialect continuum that stretched from the southern English coast to the Forth estuary. However, a literary standard had emerged that was based around the West Saxon dialect spoken in the area centred on Winchester, the capital of Wessex. Also spoken in the territory ruled by the Anglo-Saxons were the Celtic languages of Old Cornish, Old Welsh, and Cumbric, mainly in peripheral regions in which settlement by the Anglo-Saxons had been fairly minor, and Old Norse across a wide swath of territory in the North and the East Midlands.

Norman conquest of England and consequences

William II of Normandy landed at Hastings, Sussex on September 29, 1066. He deployed his men in the nearby area while he waited for King Harold Godwinson's troops. On October 14, exhausted by previous clashes with Scandinavians in the north and the long journey to Hastings, the English army lost the battle quickly and became disorganised after Harold was killed. After the defeat of the English, William claimed the throne as King of England on December 25, 1066. He was crowned William I of England and came to be known as William the Conqueror (Guillaume le Conquérant in French). William's followers became a new Norman ruling class and imposed their language on the upper echelons of society. Anglo-Saxon dialects were supplanted by Norman in the royal court and aristocratic circles, the justice system, and the 
Church. Influential Norman settlers used their native language in daily life, but more modest rural and urban areas of society continued to speak varieties of English.

The Norman Conquest marked the beginning of a long period of interaction between England and France. Noble English families, most of them of Norman origin, taught their children French or sent them to study in France. The early Norman kings spent more time in Normandy than in England. Royal marriages also encouraged the expansion of the French language in England. From Henry II Plantagenet and Eleanor of Aquitaine in the early 12th century to Henry VI and Margaret of Anjou in the 15th century, many English kings married French princesses, which kept French as the language of the English court for several centuries and strengthened its use in England overall.

Decline of French as first language in England
Throughout the late 11th and 12th centuries, the Norman nobility had ruled over both England and Normandy. However, in 1204, Normandy was lost to France and so the aristocracy began to associate more with an English identity. Anti-French sentiment in England began to grow after Henry III invited relatives of his wife, Eleanor of Provence, to settle in England and bestowed lavish favours on them. Written works promoting the use of English in England began to appear around then, such as the Cursor Mundi. Meanwhile, the French spoken in England was stigmatised as a provincial variety by speakers from the Continent, particularly because the Anglo-Norman that was spoken by the elites had taken on a syntactical structure that resembled English. Some nobles had simply shifted to English entirely.

In 1328, Charles IV of France died without an heir. Edward III of England and Philip VI of France disputed the French throne, and the Hundred Years' War ensued. The war provoked further negative feelings towards French in England, as it came to be seen as the language of the enemy. English had reasserted itself as a language of government and learning after over 200 years as a language of low prestige. In 1349, English became the language of instruction at the University of Oxford, which had taught in French or Latin.

The use of English became widespread by the introduction of printing to England by William Caxton in 1476. Henry IV (1367-1413) was the first English king whose first language was English, and Henry V (1387-1422) was the first king of England to use English in official documents.

Lexical

The most notable influence of French on English has been its extensive contribution to the English lexicon. It has been estimated that about a third of the words in English are French in origin; linguist Henriette Walter claims that this total may be as high as two thirds. Linguist Anthony Lacoudre has estimated that over 40,000 English words come directly from French and may be understood without orthographical change by French speakers.

Albert C. Baugh and Thomas Cable note that "although this influx of French words was brought about by the victory of the Conqueror and by the political and social consequences of that victory, it was neither sudden nor immediately apparent. Rather it began slowly and continued with varying tempo for a long time. Indeed, it can hardly be said to have ever stopped." Baugh and Cable define several categories of early French borrowings:
 Government and social class (revenue, authority, realm, duke, count, marquis, servant, peasant)
 Church (religion, sermon, prayer, abbey, saint, faith, pray, convent, cloister)
 Law (justice, crime, jury, pardon, indict, arrest, felon, evidence)
 War (army, navy, battle, garrison, captain, sergeant, combat, defense)
 Fashion (gown, robe, frock, collar, satin, crystal, diamond, coat, embroidery)
 Food (feast, taste, mackerel, salmon, bacon, fry, mince, plate, goblet)
 Learning and medicine (paper, preface, study, logic, surgeon, anatomy, stomach, remedy, poison)

In many cases a French word might have existed alongside a Germanic word that meant the same thing, with the two words eventually taking on different senses. Exemplifying this are the "food pairs" in which the English word refers to a living animal on a farm, while the French word signifies the meat of the animal after it has been made into a meal (cow and beef, swine and pork, sheep and mutton). Other times, the same French word was borrowed twice, once from the Norman dialect and then again from the Parisian dialect, with different meanings arising. Such doublets include Norman catch vs Parisian chase, Norman warranty vs Parisian guarantee and Norman warden vs Parisian guardian.

The period from 1250 to 1400 was the most prolific for borrowed words from French. Forty percent of all the French words in English appear for the first time between these two dates. After this period, the scale of the lexical borrowing decreased sharply, though French loan words have continued to enter English even into the modern era.

Morphological and syntactical
The gradual decline of the English singular pronouns thou and thee and their replacement with ye and later you have been linked to the parallel French use of vous in formal settings. The ubiquity of -s to mark plurals in English has also been attributed to French influence, but the -s ending was common in English even prior to the Norman Conquest since -as was the standard suffix form for plurals of strong masculine nouns in the nominative and accusative cases. It is possible that the dominance of that form over other endings such as -en was strengthened by the similarity of the French plural construction.

Other suggestions include the impersonal one ("one does what one wants") and possessive phrases such as "the guitar of David", rather than "David's guitar", but similar forms are found in other Germanic languages, though, which casts doubt on the proposed French derivations. Attempts have also been made to connect the increased use of gerunds towards the end of the Middle English period to the French gérondif form.

They are fairly rare in English, but constructions that place the adjective after the noun (attorney general) are derived from French.

English has adopted several prefix and suffix morphemes from French, including pre-, -ous, -ity, -tion, -ture, -ment, -ive and -able. They now stand alongside native English forms such as over-, -ish, -ly, -ness, -ship, -some, -less and -ful.

Phonological
The influence of French on English pronunciation is generally held to have been fairly minor, but a few examples have been cited:
 The use of non-word-initial stress patterns in some loan words of French origin
 The phonemisation of the voiced fricatives /z/ and /v/ (in Old English, they were allophones of their voiceless counterparts, /s/ and /f/, a pattern that can still be seen in some dialects of West Country English)
 The use of the diphthongs /ui/ and /oi/

Orthographic
In the centuries following the Norman conquest, English was written mainly by Norman scribes. Thus, French spelling conventions had a great effect on the developing English orthography. Innovations that then arose include the following:
 "qu-" instead of "cw-" (queen)
 "gh" instead of "h" (night)
 "ch" or "cch" instead of "c" (church)
 "ou" instead of "u" (house)
 "sh" or "sch" instead of "sc" (ship)
 "dg" instead of "cg" or "gg" (bridge)
 "o" instead of "u" (love, son; the "u" that was originally in such words was considered difficult to distinguish from the surrounding letters)
 doubling of vowels to represent long vowel sounds (see)
 doubling of consonants after short vowels (sitting)
 more use of "k", "z" and "j"

Several letters derived from Germanic runes or Irish script that had been common in Old English, such as ƿ and ð, largely fell out of use, possibly because the Normans were unfamiliar with them. þ, the final remaining runic letter in English, survived in a severely-altered form until the 17th century.

Miscellaneous
The effects of the Norman conquest had an indirect influence on the development of the standardized English that began to emerge towards the end of the 15th century. The takeover of the elite class by the Normans, as well as their decision to move the capital of England from Winchester to London, ended the dominance of the Late West Saxon literary language. London's growing influence led to the English spoken nearby, which was largely derived from the Mercian dialect of Old English, to become the standard written form, rather than that of West Saxon areas such as Hampshire, Wiltshire and Somerset.

The Normans had a strong influence on English personal names. Old English names such as Alfred, Wulfstan, Aelfric, Harold, Godwin and Athelstan largely fell out of fashion and were replaced by the likes of Hebrew, Greek, or Christian names such as John, Peter and Simon as well as Normanized Germanic names like William, Richard, Henry, Robert, Roger and Hugh.

Examples of English words of French origin

Though the following list is in no way exhaustive, it illustrates some of the more common English words of French origin. Examples of French-to-English lexical contributions are classified by field and in chronological order. The periods during which these words were used in the English language are specified to the extent that this is possible.

Law and society
This is not a full list.

 Crown: from couronne, 12th c.
 Custom: from custume, 12-13th c.
 Squire: from escuier, the bearer of the écu, bouclier, 12-13th c.
 Assizes: from assises, 13th c.
 Franchise: from franchise, 13th c.
 Joust: from joust, 13th c.
 Justice: from justice 
 Marriage: from mariage, spouses' belongings, 13th c.
 Parliament: from parlement, conversation, 13th c.
 Heir: from heir, 13th c.
 Summon: from semondre, invite someone to do something, 13th c.
 Nice: from nice, idiot/stupid, 13th-14th c.
 Bourgeois, from bourgeois, 19th c.
 Fiancé, from fiancé, 19th c.
 Chef/chief, from chef, 19th c.
 Flirt, from conter fleurette, flower storytelling.

Commerce
 Caterer: from Old Norman acatour, buyer, 11th c.
 Pay: from paier, appease, 12th c.
 Ticket: from estiquet, small sign, 12th c.
 Purchase: from prochacier, "to try obtain (something)", 12th c.
 Rental: from rental, subject to an annual fee, 12th c.
 Debt: from det, 12th c.
 Affair: from à faire, 13th c.
 Bargain: from bargaignier, hesitate, 14th c.
 Budget: from bougette, small fabric pocket for coins and bills of exchange.

Sport
 Champion: from champion, end 12th c.
 Sport: from desport, entertainment, 12th c.
 Challenge: from chalenge, 12th c.
 Record: from record, 12th-13th c.
 To record: from recorder, 12th-13th c.
 Court: from court/curt/cort, 13th c.
 Tennis: from tenez, hold, 14th c.
 Hockey: from hocquet, hooked stick, date unknown.

Domestic life
 Aunt: from ante, 12th c.
 Butler: from bouteleur (12th c.), or bouteiller (14th c.), sommelier.
 Chamber: from chambre, 13th c.
 Curtain: from cortine, bed curtain, 13th c.
 Blanket: from blanquette, white sheet cover, 13th c.
 Towel: from toailler, 13th c.
 Chair: from chaiere, 13th c.
 Pantry: from paneterie, bread storage place, 13th c.
 Cushion: from coissin, 14th c.
 Closet: from closet, small enclosure, 14th c.

Food and cooking
 Cabbage: from caboche, "head" in Norman-Picard language, 11th c.
 Bacon: from bacon, pork meat, "Salted bacon arrow", beginning of the 12th c.
 Custard: from crouste, crust, 12th-13th c.
 Toast: from the verb toster, to grill, 12th-13th c.
 Cauldron: from Anglo-Norman caudron, 12th-13th c.
 Cattle: from Anglo-Normand catel, property, 12th-13th c.
 Mustard: from moustarde, condiment made from seeds mixed with grape must, 13th c.
 Grape: from grape, bunch of grapes, 13th c.
 Mutton: from moton, sheep, end 13th c.
 Beef: from buef, beef, circa 1300.
 Pork: from porc, circa 1300.
 Poultry: from pouletrie, poultry (the animal), circa end 14th c.
 Claret: from claret, red wine, 14th c.
 Mince: from mincier, to cut in small pieces, 14th c.
 Stew: from estuver, to "soak in a hot bath", 14th c.
 Veal: from vel, calf, 14th c.
 Banquet: from banquet, 15th c.
 Carrot: 16th c.
 Aperitif: 16th c.
 Hors d’œuvre: end 17th c.
 Douceur (small gift, gratuity): end 17th c.
 Casserole (stewed dish): end 17th c.
 Menu: end 17th c.
 Gratin: end 17th c.
 Terrine: 18th c.
 Croissant: 19th c.
 Foie gras: 19th c.
 Mayonnaise: 19th c.
 Buffet: 19th c.
 Restaurant: 19th c.
 Bouillon: 20th c.
 Velouté: 20th c.
 Confit: 20th c.
 À la carte: 20th c.

Art of living and fashion
 Gown: from gone, pantyhose, 12th century
 Attire: from atir, "what is used for clothing", 12th century
 Petticoat: from petti ("of little value") and cotte ("long tunic"), 13th century
 Poney: from poulenet or poleney, foal, date unknown.
 Toilette: 17th century
 Lingerie: end 17th century
 Blouse: end 17th century
 Rouge: from rouge à lèvres, lipstick, end 17th century
 Salon: end 17th century
 Couturier: 19th century
 Luxe: 19th century
 Eau de Cologne/Cologne: 19th century
 Massage: 19th century
 Renaissance: 19th century
 Chic: 20th century
 Boutique: 20th century
 Prêt à porter: 20th century
 Libertine: 20th century
 Parfum/perfume: from parfum 20th century
 Déjà vu: 20th century

Other domains
 Canvas: from Norman-Picard canevas, 11th century
 Catch: from Old Norman cachier, to hunt, 11th-12th century
 Proud: from prud, valiant, beginning 12th century
 Causeway: from Anglo-Norman calciata, 12th century
 Kennel: from Anglo-Norman kenil, dog, 12th-13th century
 Guile: from guile, fraud/deceitfulness, 12th-13th century
 Foreign: from forain, "the stranger", 12th-13th century
 Grief: from grief, 12th-13th century
 Solace: from soulace, "the rejoicing", 12th-13th century
 Scorn: from escorner, to insult, 12th-13th century
 Square: from esquarre, 12th-13th century
 Conceal: from conceler, to hide, 12th-13th century
 Strive: from estriver, to make efforts, 12th-13th century
 Very: from veray, true, 12th-13th century
 Faint: from feint, soft/unenthusiastic, 12th-13th century
 Eager: from egre, sour, 12th-13th century
 Challenge: from chalenge, 13th century
 Change: from the verb changier, to change, 13th century
 Chapel: from chapele, 13th century
 Choice: from chois, 13th century
 Mischief: from meschef, misfortune, 13th century
 Achieve: from achever, come to an end/accomplish (a task), 13th century
 Bizarre: 17th century
 Rendezvous: 17th century

Bibliography
 Chirol Laure, Les « mots français » et le mythe de la France en anglais contemporain, Paris, Klincksieck (coll. « Études linguistiques », 17), 1973, 215 p.
 Duchet Jean-Louis, « Éléments pour une histoire de l'accentuation lexicale en anglais », Études Anglaises : Grande-Bretagne, États-Unis, vol. 47, 1994, pp. 161–170.
 Kristol Andres Max, « Le début du rayonnement parisien et l'unité du français au Moyen âge : le témoignage des manuels d'enseignement du français écrits en Angleterre entre le XIIIe et le début du XVe siècle », Revue de Linguistique Romane, vol. 53, (1989), pp. 335–367.
 Lusignan Serge, La langue des rois au Moyen Âge. Le français en France et en Angleterre, Paris, PUF (coll. « Le nœud gordien »), 2004, 296 p.
 Mossé Fernand, Esquisse d'une histoire de la langue anglaise, 1ère édition, Lyon, IAC, 1947, 268 p.
 Rothwell William, « À quelle époque a-t-on cessé de parler français en Angleterre ? », Mélanges de philologie romane offerts à Charles Camproux, 1978, pp. 1075–1089.
 Walter Henriette, Honni soit qui mal y pense : l'incroyable histoire d'amour entre le français et l'anglais, Paris, Robert Laffont, 2001, 364 p.

See also 
 English words of French origin
 Glossary of French words and expressions in English
 Francophonie
 Francophone countries
 Organisation Internationale de la Francophonie
 History of France
 History of England
 Languages

References 

England in the High Middle Ages
History of the French language
History of the English language
Language contact